Jean-Armand du Peyrer, Comte de Troisville (or Tresville) (1598 – 8 May 1672) was a French officer. He was fictionalized under the name Monsieur de Tréville in Alexandre Dumas's 1844 novel The Three Musketeers.

Biography

Origins
Du Peyrer was born at Oloron-Sainte-Marie. He was not from aristocratic stock, but of recent nobility. It was his father, Jean du Peyrer, who introduced the name de Trois-villes or Tréville into the family. In 1607 he bought the region of Trois-Villes which effectively brought him nobility, according to the customs of the Basque Country at the time. This purchase also allowed the elder Du Peyrer the right to be considered a gentleman and to sit upon the council of gentlemen in the viscountcy of Soule. He died at Trois-Villes.

References

1598 births
1672 deaths
People from Oloron-Sainte-Marie
Alexandre Dumas characters
Counts of France
17th-century French military personnel
Musketeers of the Guard